Yodchai is a Lightweight Muay Thai fighter from Thailand, currently fighting out of YOKKAO Training Center Bangkok. He is a WBC Muay Thai International champion.

Biography 
Yodchai was born in the northern Thai province of Uttaradit. He began training at 8 and fought shortly after. He soon moved to Lok Bor Kor gym in Singburi, training and fighting for many years before he was acquired by YOKKAO Fight Team in December, 2016. 

On 26 January 2019, Yodchai fought against Italian fighter, Jonathan Astarita at Yokkao 35 in Turin, Italy for the WBC Lightweight International title. Yodchai won the fight by technical knockout after Astarita was unable to continue after round 3.

On 16 April 2016, Yodchai fought Jomhod Chor Ketweena in the Petchsupaphan promotion main event at Lumpinee stadium. The match ended in a draw and was awarded the “Fight of the Month” by Lumpinee stadium.

Titles and accomplishments 

 2019 WBC Muay Thai International Lightweight Champion

Muay Thai record 

Legend:

References

1995 births
Living people
Thai male Muay Thai practitioners
People from Uttaradit province